François Bonnet may refer to:

 François Bonnet (canoeist) (born 1947), French canoer
 François Bonnet (cyclist), French cyclist